Shayan is a sub-district located in Maswarah District, Al Bayda Governorate, Yemen.  Shayan had a population of 1003  according to the 2004 census.

References 

Sub-districts in Maswarah District